Peter Stojanović (born 18 March 1990) is a Slovenian footballer who plays as a midfielder.

Club career
Born in Ljubljana, back then still within Yugoslavia, Stojanović played with ND Slovan as a youth player. In 2008, he signed with Celje. After spending the first season on loan with Zagorje in the Slovenian Second League, he returned to Celje and made his debut in the Slovenian PrvaLiga in 2009. During the winter break of the 2009–10 season, he moved to Olimpija Ljubljana.

In summer 2011 he moved to another First League club, Koper, but at the end of the first half of the season he moved abroad joining Slovak 2. liga club ŽP Šport Podbrezová.  In summer 2012 he signed with Serbian First League club FK Bežanija.

He then played with FC ŠTK 1914 Šamorínin the Slovak 2. liga. Next he had a spell back home with NK Brinje-Grosuplje. He had spells in Austrian ower-league clubs Nußdorf/Debant and Union Lind before returning to Slovenia, where he signed with futsal team FC Ivančna Gorica.

International career
In 2009, he made four appearances for Slovenia U19, making his debut on 24 March 2009 against Hungary.

References

External links 
Player profile at PrvaLiga 

Living people
1990 births
Footballers from Ljubljana
Slovenian footballers
Slovenia youth international footballers
Association football wingers
Slovenian PrvaLiga players
NK Celje players
NK Zagorje players
NK Olimpija Ljubljana (2005) players
FC Koper players
NK Krka players
NK Ivančna Gorica players
FK Železiarne Podbrezová players
FC ŠTK 1914 Šamorín players
Expatriate footballers in Slovakia
FK Bežanija players
Serbian First League players
Expatriate footballers in Serbia
Expatriate footballers in Austria
Slovenian expatriate footballers
Slovenian expatriate sportspeople in Serbia
Slovenian expatriate sportspeople in Austria
Slovenian expatriate sportspeople in Slovakia